George Hooper may refer to:
 George Hooper (bishop) (1640–1727), English bishop
 George K. Hooper (1868–1939), American engineer and architect
 George Hooper (artist) (1910–1994), British artist
 Arthur George Hooper (1857–1940), British Liberal Party politician